Nayef Rashed (born 5 February 1949), also known as Adam Hussein, is a Middle-Eastern actor living in the United Kingdom. After training at London's Drama Centre, he has appeared in such television favourites as Only Fools and Horses, The Bill, and feature films such as Navy Seals. He appeared in the film Salmon Fishing in the Yemen as the Rebel Leader.

Filmography

External links 

1949 births
Living people
British male film actors
British male television actors